Wilderness is the fourth album, by American singer-songwriter Sophie B. Hawkins, released in 2004 (see 2004 in music).

Track listing
All songs written by Sophie B. Hawkins, except where noted

"Beautiful Girl" – 3:45
"Open Up Your Eyes" – 3:30
"Meet Me on a Rooftop" – 3:42
"Walking on Thin Ice" – 4:08
"Blue" – 4:04
"Sweetsexywoman" – 4:43
"Surfer Girl" – 3:10
"Adrian" – 3:26
"Soul Lover" – 3:44
"Angel of Darkness" – 4:00
"You Make Me High" – 3:29
"Feelin' Good" (Leslie Bricusse, Anthony Newley) – 5:31
"Soul Lover" (Infinite Space Mix) [bonus track] – 6:56

Personnel
Sophie B. Hawkins – guitar, percussion, piano, drums, keyboards, vocals
Christian Berman – bass, keyboards
Dave Burns – drums
Sebastião Batista DaSilva – keyboards
Kareem Devlin – guitar
Carl Fischer – trombone, trumpet
Robbie Mildenberger – guitar
David Piltch – upright bass
Josh Sklair – guitar
Lee Thornburg – trombone, trumpet
David Woodford – baritone saxophone, tenor saxophone

Production
Producers: Sophie B. Hawkins, The Berman Brothers, Sylvia Massy Shivy
Engineers: Sophie B. Hawkins, Christian Berman, Michael Kramer, Sylvia Massy Shivy, Rich Veltrop
Assistant engineers: Zech Algood, Colin Miller
Horn engineer: Chris Papastephanou Digital
Mixing: Joe Chiccarelli, Sylvia Massy Shivy, Rich Veltrop
Mastering: Adam Ayan, Bob Ludwig
Assistants: George Leger III, Chris Papastephanou
Digital editing: George Leger III
Editing: Chris Papastephanou
Drum programming: Sophie B. Hawkins
Programming: Sophie B. Hawkins, Christian Berman, Sebastião Batista DaSilva
Arranger: Sophie B. Hawkins
Horn arrangements: Sophie B. Hawkins, Lee Thornburg
Art direction: Christine Wilson
Paintings: Sophie B. Hawkins
Photography: Sophie B. Hawkins
Video editor: George Artope

External links
 Full lyrics of all tracks at official website

Sophie B. Hawkins albums
2004 albums